Kathy L. Rapp (born February 23, 1951) is an American politician and current Republican member of the Pennsylvania House of Representatives from the 65th District.

Early life and education
Rapp was born on February 23, 1951, in Sligo, Pennsylvania. She graduated from Warren Area High School in 1969 and later attended Bryant & Stratton College. She earned her paralegal certification from Slippery Rock State College.

Career
Prior to elective office, Rapp served as a community relations representative with Beverly Health Care in Warren, Pennsylvania. She volunteered for the Parent Education Network in York, Pennsylvania. She also worked as a compliance monitor with the Pennsylvania Department of Education, where she helped examine special education programs and served as a consultant with the Parent Education Network.

Pennsylvania House of Representatives
Rapp was first elected to the represent the 65th District in the Pennsylvania House of Representatives in 2004. She has since won re-election to nine more consecutive terms.

Political positions
Rapp was "very much" opposed to legalizing  medical cannabis in Pennsylvania, believing that it could open the door to full adult use cannabis legalization.

In 2020, Rapp was among 26 Pennsylvania House Republicans who called for the reversal of Joe Biden's certification as the winner of Pennsylvania's electoral votes in the 2020 United States presidential election, citing false claims of election irregularities.

Personal life
Rapp lives in Warren, Pennsylvania. She has three children and seven grandchildren.

References

External links
Representative Rapp's official web site
Pennsylvania House profile

Living people
Republican Party members of the Pennsylvania House of Representatives
People from Warren, Pennsylvania
Women state legislators in Pennsylvania
21st-century American politicians
21st-century American women politicians
1951 births